Molophilus pollex is a special of fly in the familyLimoniidae.

References

External links
 

Limoniidae
Insects described in 1931